Tad Dufelmeier Jr. (born 9 February 1996) is an Australian professional basketball player who last played for the Adelaide 36ers of the National Basketball League (NBL). He played college basketball in the United States for Salt Lake Community College and Concordia University Irvine.

Early life 
Born and raised in Canberra, Australia, Dufelmeier attended Erindale College. He was named to the under-17 Australian National Team and won an Asia-Pacific Games Silver Medal. He also played in the SEABL for the Canberra Gunners in 2013 and 2014.

College career 
Dufelmeier played his freshman season as a member of the SLCC Bruins. He averaged 3.7 points and 2.0 rebounds per game. In his sophomore season, he averaged 9.7 points and 3.9 rebounds, starting all the games but one. The Bruins would advance to the national championship game in 2016, winning the school's second title. Dufelmeier was selected to the All-tournament team, and also received the Charles Sesher Sportsmanship Award. Upon completion of his NJCAA eligibility, Dufelmeier signed with NCAA Division II CUI.

In his first season at Concordia, he averaged 11.2 points, 4.4 rebounds, and 3.6 assists per game. His following season saw those numbers rise to 12.1 points, 4.9 rebounds, and 5.5 assists.

Professional career

Hobart Huskies and Southern Huskies (2019) 
In 2019, Dufelmeier played for the Hobart Huskies in the NBL1. In 18 games, he averaged 18.8 points, 6.1 rebounds, 4.9 assists, and 1.9 steals per game. He also had a two-game stint with the Southern Huskies in the New Zealand NBL.

Cairns Taipans (2019–2021) 
For the 2019–20 NBL season, Dufelmeier joined the Cairns Taipans as a development player. He played in five games during the season. He returned to the Taipans in February 2021 as an injury replacement for Majok Deng.

Hobart Chargers (2021–present) 
Following the 2020–21 NBL season, Dufelmeier joined the Hobart Chargers of the NBL1 South.

Adelaide 36ers (2021–2022) 
On 22 July 2021, Dufelmeier signed with the Adelaide 36ers for the 2021–22 NBL season.

Personal life 
Dufelmeier's father, Tad, also played in the NBL for the Canberra Cannons as an American import. He has one brother, Daylan and two sisters, Taqui and Bianca.

References

External links 
 NBL player profile
 Concordia Eagles player bio
 SLCC Bruins player bio

1996 births
Living people
Adelaide 36ers players
Australian expatriate basketball people in the United States
Australian people of American descent
Cairns Taipans players
Concordia Eagles men's basketball players
Point guards
Salt Lake Bruins men's basketball players
Southern Huskies players
Sportspeople from Canberra